"Where's Captain Kirk?" is a 1979 single released by punk/new wave band Spizzenergi. It was released on the Rough Trade Records label and spent seven weeks at the top of the UK Indie Chart.

Background
The single was the fourth to be released by the band Spizzenergi, who had previously been known as Spizzoil. The song was written by lead singer Spizz and keyboard player Mark Coalfield. The single reached the number one spot on the UK Indie Chart and stayed there for seven weeks. "Where's Captain Kirk?" was the first number one single on the chart, which had just been established.

In July 1980 Record Mirror revealed that the single sold more than 60,000 units without ever charting.

Following the success of "Where's Captain Kirk?", which refers to captain James T. Kirk of the Star Trek fictional universe, two further Star Trek related songs were released by the band. "Spock's Missing" followed six months later and "Five Year Mission (Featuring the Return of Spock)" was released on a later album. A Portuguese single released in 1981 had "Where's Captain Kirk?" on the a-side and "Spock's Missing" on the b-side. The single was later re-released by Spizz as a solo record in 1987. Both versions of the song were included on the compilation album Spizz Not Dead Shock, while the original is also on Spizzhistory.

London Punkharmonic Orchestra have included a recording on the album Classical Punk.

The single also lent the name to the best of collection for Spizzenergi. The single is included on the album both as the first song, and again as the twentieth with a live version recorded at the Holiday in the Sun punk festival.

Critical reception

 Melody Maker named it its single of the week on the week of the first release.
 It was included in the NME Writers 100 Best Indie Singles Ever 1992. 
 More than two decades after its release, it was included at number 29 in Mojo magazine's list of the best punk rock singles of all time 
 Jason Heller reviewed "Where's Captain Kirk" for Tor.com in 2010 as part of his series entitled "Frequency Rotation" which looked at science fiction related music. He called it a "loving (if kitsch-happy) homage to Star Trek—and especially its square-jawed, twinkly-eyed, ass-kicking hero."
 On a Star Trek television special, Radio One DJ John Peel, in reference to the song, said that Spizzenergi recorded "the only Star Trek tribute worthy of the Enterprise's jukebox". It was also placed by listeners at No. 40 in his 1980 Festive Fifty.

Credits and personnel
Credits taken from the Spizzenergi official website.

Charts

References

External links

"Where's Captain Kirk?" – song lyrics

1979 singles
Music based on Star Trek
Unofficial works based on Star Trek
1979 songs
Spizzenergi songs
UK Independent Singles Chart number-one singles